Harihar railway station is a main railway station in Davanagere district, Karnataka. Its code is HRR. It serves Harihar town. The station consists of three platforms. The platforms are not well sheltered.

Harihar is well connected with most of the major cities like New Delhi, Mumbai, Bangalore, Pune, Bellary and Chennai through regular trains.

Trains 

 Yesvantpur–Harihar Intercity Express
 Chitradurga–Harihar Passenger
 Harihar–Kotturu Passenger

References 

Mysore railway division
Railway stations in Davanagere district